was a stable of sumo wrestlers, part of the Tokitsukaze group of stables. Its last incarnation was in existence from 1972 until 2019. 

The stable was established in the Meiji era by former yokozuna Nishinoumi Kajirō I, the 16th yokozuna, who became the 7th Izutsu-oyakata. He was succeeded by Nishinoumi Kajirō II, the 25th yokozuna who ran the stable from 1909 until his death in 1931. The latest incarnation of Izutsu stable was in the hands of the same family, having been founded as Kimigahama stable by his grandson-in-law Tsurugamine Akio in 1972 and subsequently renamed Izutsu stable in 1977, after Tsurugamine obtained the stock from former yokozuna Kitanofuji (who would become the head of Kokonoe stable). Tsurugamine Akio had previously attempted to obtain the Izutsu stock from the widow of his old stablemaster, the former maegashira Tsurugamine Michiyoshi, who had run a different version of the stable from 1947 until his death in March 1972, but had been unable to come to an agreement with her. All three of Tsurugamine's sons, Sakahoko and Terao, were members of the stable, with Sakahoko and Terao emulating their father by reaching the sekiwake rank. Sakahoko took over the stable from his father in 1994. Sakahoko's nephew, Fukuzono Yoichiro, was a wrestler at the stable from 1988 until 2007, reaching a highest rank of jūryō 9. The stable declined from around 20 wrestlers when Sakahoko inherited it to just three as of 2019, of whom the sole sekitori was Kakuryū, who reached the yokozuna rank in March 2014. Sakahoko commented in 2008 that it was difficult to attract new recruits as "there are many heyas nowadays" but that as he was the only coach in the stable, a relatively small number meant he could give each wrestler close attention.

Sakahoko died at the age of 58 in September 2019. The stable's wrestlers and tokoyama were temporarily under the care of Kagamiyama, a director of the Japan Sumo Association and fellow member of the Tokitsukaze group, but moved to Michinoku stable, which is run by the former stablemate of Sakahoko, former ōzeki Kirishima, and originally branched off from Izutsu in 1974. Demolition of the building that housed Izutsu stable began on 4 November 2020. The Izutsu elder name is being used as of 2020 by the former Toyonoshima of the affiliated Tokitsukaze stable.

Ring name conventions
Most wrestlers at this stable took ring names or shikona that begin with the character 鶴 (two alternative readings: tsuru and kaku), meaning crane, in deference to the former owner, who was active as Tsurugamine.

Owners
1994–2019: 14th Izutsu (fuku-riji, former sekiwake Sakahoko)
1977-1994: 13th Izutsu (former sekiwake Tsurugamine Akio)
1974-1977: 12th Izutsu (former yokozuna Kitanofuji)
1972-1974: 11th Izutsu (former maegashira Hoshikabuto Yoshio)
1947-1972: 10th Izutsu  (former maegashira Tsurugamine Michiyoshi)
1931-1944: 9th Izutsu (former maegashira Hoshikabuto Saneyoshi)
1909-1931: 8th Izutsu (former yokozuna Nishinoumi Kajirō II)

Notable former members
Nishinoumi Kajirō II (the 25th yokozuna)
Nishinoumi Kajirō III (the 30th yokozuna)
Kakuryū Rikisaburō (the 71st yokozuna)
Toyokuni Fukuma (former ōzeki)
Kirishima Kazuhiro (former ōzeki)
Komagatake Kuniriki (former ōzeki)
Terao Tsunefumi  (former sekiwake)
 36th Kimura Shōnosuke  (given name Toshihiro Yamazaki - former chief referee)

Hairdresser
Tokotsuru (1st class tokoyama)

Location and access
Tokyo, Sumida Ward, Ryōgoku 2-2-7
8 minute walk from west exit of Ryōgoku Station on the Sōbu Line

See also 
Izutsu-oyakata
List of sumo stables
List of active sumo wrestlers
List of past sumo wrestlers
Glossary of sumo terms

References

External links 
Official site 
Japan Sumo Association profile

Defunct sumo stables